The General Education Union (AOb) is a trade union representing teachers, lecturers and support staff in education, in the Netherlands.

The union was founded on 1 January 1997, when the General Union of Education Personnel merged with Dutch Association of Teachers.  It affiliated to the Federation of Dutch Trade Unions.  By 1998, it had 72,206 members, and in 2008, this had grown slightly, to 77,943.

At the start of 2020, the union absorbed Vawo, a union for university researchers.

Presidents
1997: Jacques Tichelaar
2002: Walter Dresscher
2015: Liesbeth Verheggen
2019: Eugenie Stolk

External links

Education trade unions
Trade unions established in 1997
Trade unions in the Netherlands